A ferry is a form of transport across water.

Ferry may also refer to:

Places

United Kingdom
Broughty Ferry, a former village and now suburb of Dundee, Scotland
Ferry Point, England
Ferry Road, in Scotland
Owston Ferry, a village in Lincolnshire, England

United States
Ferry, Alaska, a census-designated place
Ferry, Ohio, an unincorporated community
Ferry County, Washington
Ferry Pass, Florida
Ferry Township, Michigan
Harpers Ferry (disambiguation), several places in the United States of America

Elsewhere
Ferry Island, in British Columbia, Canada
Ferry Point, Hong Kong, China

Buildings and structures
San Francisco Ferry Building, a ferry terminal in San Francisco Bay, California
Ferry Farm, the childhood home of George Washington in Stafford County, Virginia
Ferry Field, a stadium in Ann Arbor, Michigan
Ferry railway station in Norfolk, England

People

Given name
Ferry Carondelet (1473–1528), a Habsburg diplomat
Ferry Corsten (born 1973), a Dutch musician
Ferenc Kocsur (1930–1990), Hungarian-French footballer
Ferry Porsche, son of Ferdinand Porsche (1909-1998)
Ferry Rotinsulu (born 1982), Indonesian footballer
Ferry Sonneville (1931–2003), Indonesian badminton player

Surname
April Ferry (born 1932), American costume designer
Björn Ferry (born 1978), Swedish biathlete
Bob Ferry (born 1937), American basketball player and executive
Bryan Ferry (born 1945),  English musician
Catherine Ferry (singer) (born 1953), French singer
Danny Ferry (born 1966), American basketball player and executive
David Ferry (actor) (born 1951), Canadian-born actor
David Ferry (poet) (born 1924), American poet and translator
George Bowman Ferry (1851–1918), American architect
James Ferry (disambiguation)
 James Ferry (priest) (fl. 1992–2011), priest of the Anglican Church of Canada
 James Ferry (footballer) (born 1997), English footballer
 Jim Ferry (basketball) (born 1967), American college basketball coach
Jules Ferry (1832–1893), French statesman
Lou Ferry (1927–2004), American Football coach
Luc Ferry (born 1951), French philosopher
Orris S. Ferry (1823–1875), American general and politician
Otis Ferry (born 1982), son of Bryan, fox hunting activist
Pasqual Ferry (fl. 1993–2010), comic book artist
Simon Ferry (born 1988), Scottish footballer
Thomas W. Ferry (1827–1896), American politician
Tim Ferry (born 1975), motorcycle racer
William H. Ferry (1819–1880), New York politician

Other
Ferry flying, transportation of aircraft

See also

Fairy, a magical or mystical legendary being
Fairey (disambiguation)
Ferri (disambiguation)
Ferrie (disambiguation)